Los Cerralbos is a municipality of Spain belonging to the province of Toledo, in the autonomous community of Castilla–La Mancha.

History 
The municipality was created in 1835 under the purview of the 1833 royal decree of territorial division of Spain, as a merger of the municipalities of Cerralbo de Talavera and Cerralbo de Escalona.

References

Municipalities in the Province of Toledo